Vikramabahu Karunaratne (born 8 March 1943) is a Sri Lankan politician. He was a candidate in the 2010 presidential election.

Early life
Karunarathne was born on 8 March 1943 in Lunugala in present day south-east Sri Lanka. Both his parents were teachers. He received his primary education at Ananda Shasthralaya, Mathugama before going onto Ananda College, Colombo for his secondary education. Thereafter he went to the University of Ceylon from where he graduated with a first class honours in electrical engineering. He received a Commonwealth scholarship to study at the University of Cambridge from which he received a doctorate in 1970. He returned to Ceylon and started an academic career.

Politics
Karunaratne became politically active very early in his life, joining the Lanka Sama Samaja Party (LSSP) in 1962 whilst an undergraduate at the University of Ceylon. He was elected to the LSSP's Central Committee in 1972 but fell out with the party's leadership over their support for the Sri Lanka Freedom Party and its 1972 Republican Constitution. He was expelled from the LSSP.

In 1977 Karunaratne joined with other former members of the LSSP, including Vasudeva Nanayakkara, to form the Nava Sama Samaja Party (New Social Equality Party).

In 1978 he was arrested in Kandy for attempting to put up protest slogans against the President prior to his visit to Kandy. He was released without charge after a few months of detention, and the University of Peradeniya which suspended him from service soon after his arrest reinstated him after a rather delayed inquiry. He was forced to leave the University after he collected his back pay.he was reinstated by Cabinet decision in 2001 but was not allowed by the university. human rights commission intervened and present government paid back wages and restored status.

The Sri Lankan government proscribed the NSSP, Janatha Vimukthi Peramuna (JVP) and Communist Party of Sri Lanka (CP) after the Black July anti-Tamil riots of 1983. Karunaratne, Vasudeva Nanayakkara, Rohana Wijeweera and other left-wing politicians went into hiding until 1985 when the proscription was lifted.

In 1987 the NSSP joined with the LSSP, CP and Sri Lanka Mahajana Pakshaya (SLMP) to form the United Socialist Alliance. Karunaratne was injured on 2 December 1988 when a JVP gang attacked an election rally at Kadawatte near Colombo in support of the SLMP's presidential candidate Oswin Abeygunasekara. The JVP attacked numerous left-wing politicians and their supporters during its second insurrection.

In 1998 the NSSP joined with the National Democratic Movement, New Democratic Party and United Socialist Party (a breakaway faction of the NSSP) to form the New Left Front (NLF). The USP has since left the NLF but the Democratic Left Front (another breakaway faction of the NSSP formed by Vasudeva Nanayakkara) has joined the NLF. Since 2004 the NLF has restyled itself as Left Front.

Presidential candidate
On 26 November 2009 it was announced that Karunaratne would be the Left Front's candidate for the presidential election due to be held on 26 January 2010.

References

 
 
Marxism in 21st Century. "Ask from Bahu"

External links

1943 births
Alumni of Ananda College
Alumni of the University of Cambridge
Alumni of the University of Ceylon (Peradeniya)
Lanka Sama Samaja Party politicians
Living people
People from Badulla District
Sinhalese academics
Sinhalese politicians
Candidates in the 2010 Sri Lankan presidential election
Sri Lankan Trotskyists